The Rest on the Flight into Egypt is a c.1640 gilt-bronze relief by Alessandro Algardi. It and its companion piece The Martyrdom of St Paul are both contemporary replicas of the artist's reliefs accompanying the same artist's The Martyrdom of St Paul, a marble group for San Paolo Maggiore in Bologna. Both replicas are both now in the Victoria and Albert Museum, whilst a second version of Rest is now in the Fitzwilliam Museum in Cambridge.

References

Flight into Egypt in art
1640s sculptures
Statues of the Madonna and Child
Reliefs in the United Kingdom
Sculptures of the Victoria and Albert Museum